Four Winds may refer to:
Classical compass winds, the winds associated with the points of the compass

In Mythology-
The Anemoi, personifications of winds in Greek mythology
The Four Winds (Mesopotamian)

Businesses
Four Winds Casinos, Michigan, United States
Four Winds International, a motorhome manufacturer (now known as Thor Motor Coach)

Literature
Four Winds (play), a 1953 play by Alex Atkinson
The Four Winds (novel), by Kristin Hannah, 2021

Music
Four Winds (EP), a 2007 EP by the indie rock band Bright Eyes
Four Winds (album), a 2009 album by The Lightning Seeds
"Four Winds", a song from the 1999 album Guitars by Mike Oldfield

Places
Four Winds (New Orleans), a historic apartment building in New Orleans, Louisiana, United States
Casinos in Michigan, United States:
Four Winds Dowagiac
Four Winds Hartford
Four Winds New Buffalo
Four Winds Field at Coveleski Stadium, baseball facility, South Bend, Indiana, United States
Four Winds, a suburb of south Belfast, Northern Ireland

See also
 Four Winns, former American boat-builder
 The Four Winds of Love, series of novels by Compton Mackenzie